"Costumbres" is a song written and produced by Juan Gabriel and performed by Spanish singer Rocío Dúrcal. It was recorded for her studio album Canta A Juan Gabriel Volumen 6. The song was released by Ariola Records in 1985, as a B-side to "Jamas Te Prometí un Jardin de Rosas".

Selena version
In 1988, Selena y los Dinos covered "Costumbres" in their album Dulce Amor. It was the third and final single released from the album. Selena re-recorded the song in 1990 for her album "16 Super Exitos Originales" , a compilation album looking back at her hits prior to signing a record deal with Capitol EMI Latin. It was then later included on Siempre Selena in a remix version. The track was released as a single in late 1996.

Chart performance

La India version

In 1997, Puerto Rican-American singer La India covered the song on her album, Sobre el Fuego as her third single from the album. La India's cover became a success, reaching on the Top Ten Hot Latin Tracks peaking on #8.

Chart performance

References

1984 songs
1985 singles
1996 singles
1998 singles
Rocío Dúrcal songs
Selena songs
La India songs
Spanish-language songs
Songs written by Juan Gabriel
Song recordings produced by A. B. Quintanilla
Ariola Records singles
RMM Records singles